Gloves Come Off is a Hong Kong television action drama produced by TVB under executive producer Marco Law, starring Kevin Cheng, Raymond Wong Ho-yin, Selena Lee and Natalie Tong as the main leads. A costume fitting was held on 29 March 2011 at Tseung Kwan O TVB City Studio One at 12:30PM. A worship ceremony was then held on 28 April 2011 at Tseung Kwan O TVB City Studio 12 at 2:00PM where filming began. Filming ended in July. The first episode was aired on April 16, 2012 on the TVB Jade channel, simultaneously with TVB's overseas partners and affiliates.

Synopsis
Tong Shap Yat (Kevin Cheng) was a devoted adherent of Muay Thai, wishing to prove himself against the best practitioners of the art, he fought in underground matches in Thailand, and out of a desire to win accidentally kills an opponent. Jailed for manslaughter for 7 years, Tong returns to Hong Kong 11 years later a changed man. During his time in prison his wife died of an untreated illness leaving Tong a lone parent and sole provider for his son. A remorseful Tong attempts to wash his hands of Muay Thai and seeks to lead a peaceful and peaceable life.

Ko Wai Ting (Kenny Wong) is Tong Shap Yat's friend, and they were students together in the same Muay Thai gym, in the intervening years Ko has built a successful Muay Thai boxercise business, based on his own success and the success of his stable of fighters in competition. With his stable depleted by injuries and defections, leaving him weak in some weight classes, Ko attempts to convince Tong to return to the ring. The promised purse being enough to lift Tong from his hand-to-mouth existence as a security guard and odd-job man and allow him to better provide for his son.

But Ka Shing (Raymond Wong Ho-yin), although athletic and fit, is a newcomer to Muay Thai, saved by Ko Wai Ting from a beating by  muggers, Pat joins Ko's gym to learn enough to protect himself, but initially has no wish to fight in competition. A natural at the sport, Pat is persuaded to fight and falls in love with the experience; Muay Thai giving him a purpose and direction in life that he had previously lacked.

While each gains from being in the ring, be it money, glory or self-esteem, they each come to desire to know just how good they are and which of them is the true "King of the ring".

Cast

The Tong family

The Pat family

The Yam family

"Tang Lung" Muay Thai Gym

"The Champ" Muay Thai Gym (later Disbanded)

The Ko family

The Leung family

Other cast

Awards and nominations

Nominated: My AOD Favorites for My Favorite Drama
Nominated: My AOD Favorites for My Favorite On Screen Couple (Raymond Wong and Natalie Tong)
Nominated: My AOD Favorites for My Favorite Actors in a Leading Role (Kevin Cheng and Raymond Wong)
Won: My AOD Favorites for My Favorite Actress in a Supporting Role (Nancy Wu)
Nominated: TVB Anniversary Awards for Best Drama
Nominated: TVB Anniversary Awards for Best Actor (Kevin Cheng)
Nominated: TVB Anniversary Awards for Best Actor (Raymond Wong)
Nominated: TVB Anniversary Awards for Best Actress (Natalie Tong)
Nominated: TVB Anniversary Awards for Most Improved Male Artiste (Edwin Siu)
Nominated: TVB Anniversary Awards for Most Improved Female Artiste (Katy Kung)
Won: TVB Anniversary Awards for Best Supporting Actress (Nancy Wu)

Viewership ratings

International broadcast
  - NTV7 (Malaysia)

References

TVB dramas
Martial arts television series
Hong Kong action television series
2012 Hong Kong television series debuts
2012 Hong Kong television series endings
Kickboxing television series